Roman Staněk Jr. (born 25 February 2004) is a Czech racing driver who is currently competing in the 2023 FIA Formula 2 Championship with Trident. He previously competed in FIA Formula 3 for three seasons, where he placed fifth in 2022, and is also the 2019 ADAC Formula 4 rookies' champion.

Career

Karting
Staněk began karting internationally in 2014, competing in the 60 MINI category until 2016. The following year he moved up to OK Junior, and in 2018 he took part in the Karting World Championship in the OK category.

Lower formula championships 
Staněk made his single-seater debut in early 2019 at the last round of the Formula 4 UAE Championship, as a guest driver for Dragon Racing.

For the main season he combined the ADAC Formula 4 and Italian F4 championships, driving for the Sauber-backed US Racing-CHRS team in both. Eventually racking up three race wins and nine podiums across the two series, he was especially successful in the former, where he finished 4th in the standings and won the rookies' championship ahead of Mercedes junior Paul Aron. He starred at the opening round in Oschersleben, getting a 2nd place and a commanding race 3 win which saw him take the lead of the championship. His other two victories of the season came in the ADAC F4 Nürburgring and Italian F4 Imola rounds.

FIA Formula 3

2020 
Staněk was originally due to drive for the Prema Powerteam in the 2020 Formula Regional European Championship, but later during the COVID-19 lockdown, switched to Charouz Racing System for what he thought was a Formula 2 drive. He was instead placed in one of the team's FIA Formula 3 seats on the Thursday prior to the season opener, replacing the outgoing Niko Kari and becoming the youngest driver in the championship. With no previous testing, he struggled throughout the season, his sole points-scoring finish coming at the penultimate round in Monza. Staněk later described the move as "a mistake I really regret, because it could have ruined my career".

2021 

For the 2021 season, Staněk joined Hitech Grand Prix to race in the F3 Asian Championship and FIA Formula 3. He finished 10th in the former and 16th in the latter, with two podium finishes. He also made a one-off appearance in the Euroformula Open for Team Motopark at Imola and managed to take a win and a second place.

2022 

In 2022, upon testing for them in post-season, Staněk moved to reigning teams' champions Trident for his third season in FIA Formula 3. Following a bad start to the season at Bahrain, where he suffered punctures in both races that sent him down the order, the Czech driver achieved his first-ever F3 victory in Imola, putting himself third in the championship after two rounds. Staněk would continue this form into the next weekend at Barcelona, where he took pole position. During the feature race, he lost the lead to Victor Martins, but still finished in second place. Misfortune caught Staněk in Silverstone, where a collision with Grégoire Saucy forced him out of the race. The Czech driver wouldn't score a better finish than fifth in the following two rounds, before bouncing back into title contention with two second places at Spa-Francorchamps. Having scored more points at Zandvoort, Staněk arrived at the season finale in Monza sitting third in the drivers' standings. Despite a positive qualifying session, Staněk was unable to take advantage in the races, which meant that he finished fifth in the championship.

FIA Formula 2 Championship 
Stanĕk partook in the 2022 F2 post-season test with Trident. On 11 January 2023, it was announced that he would be promoted to Formula 2 on a full-time basis with the Italian outfit, partnering Frenchman Clément Novalak.

Formula One
Staněk was a member of the Sauber Junior Team in 2019.

Karting record

Karting career summary

Racing record

Racing career summary

† As Staněk was a guest driver, he was ineligible to score points.

Complete Italian F4 Championship results
(key) (Races in bold indicate pole position) (Races in italics indicate fastest lap)

Complete ADAC Formula 4 Championship results
(key) (Races in bold indicate pole position) (Races in italics indicate fastest lap)

Complete FIA Formula 3 Championship results
(key) (Races in bold indicate pole position; races in italics indicate points for the fastest lap of top ten finishers)

† Driver did not finish the race, but was classified as they completed more than 90% of the race distance.

Complete F3 Asian Championship results
(key) (Races in bold indicate pole position) (Races in italics indicate the fastest lap of top ten finishers)

Complete Euroformula Open Championship results 
(key) (Races in bold indicate pole position; races in italics indicate points for the fastest lap of top ten finishers)

Complete FIA Formula 2 Championship results 
(key) (Races in bold indicate pole position) (Races in italics indicate points for the fastest lap of top ten finishers)

* Season still in progress.

References

External links
 
 

2004 births
Living people
People from Valašské Meziříčí
Czech racing drivers
Italian F4 Championship drivers
ADAC Formula 4 drivers
FIA Formula 3 Championship drivers
F3 Asian Championship drivers
Charouz Racing System drivers
US Racing drivers
MP Motorsport drivers
Hitech Grand Prix drivers
Motopark Academy drivers
Trident Racing drivers
Sportspeople from the Zlín Region
Euroformula Open Championship drivers
Formula Renault Eurocup drivers
Karting World Championship drivers
UAE F4 Championship drivers
FIA Formula 2 Championship drivers
Sauber Motorsport drivers